Alberton West is a small town in Victoria, Australia. It is considered to be within the district of the larger town of Yarram.

Alberton West Post Office opened on 15 October 1887 and closed in 1967.

References

Towns in Victoria (Australia)
Shire of Wellington